Scott Logan may refer to:

 Scott Logan (rugby league) (born 1976), Australian rugby league player
 Scott Logan (swimmer) (born 1976), Australian swimmer
 Scott Logan (musician) (born 1978), American singer/songwriter